Okuda is a Japanese surname. Notable people with the surname include:

 Amy Okuda, actress
 Atsuya Okuda, Japanese-born teacher and craftsman of the hocchiku, an unrefined bamboo flute
, Japanese footballer
 Denise Okuda, author, co-author of the Star Trek Encyclopedia
 Eiji Okuda (b. 1950), Japanese actor and film director
 Gensou Okuda (1912 - 2003), Japanese Nihonga painter
, Japanese footballer
 Hiroshi Okuda (b. 1932), chairman of the Toyota Motor Corporation
 Hitoshi Okuda, is a Japanese manga artist
 Keijin Okuda, (b. 1972), Japanese voice actor
 Michael Okuda, graphic designer best known for his work on Star Trek
, Japanese golfer
 Shoji Okuda, petty officer who served as an aerial observer in the Imperial Japanese Navy
 Shuri Okuda (b. 1989), Japanese professional wrestler
 Shunsaku Okuda, Japanese musician and member of the J-Rock band The Brilliant Green
 Tamio Okuda (b. 1965), Japanese singer, songwriter, and producer
 Ted Okuda (b. 1953), American non-fiction author in film, television, and entertainment subjects
 Tomoko Okuda, Japanese boxer

Fictional characters
, a character in the Assassination Classroom anime and manga

See also
 6838 Okuda, a main-belt asteroid
 Okuda San Miguel (b. 1980), Spanish artist known for his colorful geometric murals
 Okuda Station, a railway station in Inazawa, Aichi, Japan
 Jeff Okudah (born 1999), American football cornerback

Japanese-language surnames